Fortunate Fall may refer to:

Fortunate Fall (album), 2013 album by Audrey Assad
Felix culpa, the concept of the Fall of Man being fortuitous
The Fortunate Fall (novel), 1996 novel by Raphael Carter
Fortunate Fall (band), an anarcho-metal band